Alexander Hahn (born 20 January 1993) is a German professional footballer who plays as a centre-back for Preußen Münster.

External links
 
 

1993 births
Living people
German people of Russian descent
German footballers
Association football defenders
Germany youth international footballers
SV Werder Bremen II players
SV Meppen players
1. FC Saarbrücken players
FC 08 Homburg players
Rot-Weiss Essen players
FC Viktoria 1889 Berlin players
SC Preußen Münster players
3. Liga players
Regionalliga players
Sportspeople from Omsk